Saint Francis College – Guihulngan Inc. (also known as SFC-G) is a private educational institution located in Bateria, Guihulngan, Negros Oriental, Philippines. Inspired by the Charism of Saint Francis of Assisi, three Franciscan friars including Brother Norbert Binder, Fr. Kiernan Jay Kilroy, and Fr. Bruno Hicks founded and first managed the school.

References

External links

Universities and colleges in Negros Oriental